Cold Case Files is a reality legal show/documentary on the cable channel A&E Network and the rebooted series on Netflix. It is  hosted by Bill Kurtis and the original series produced by Tom Golden. The show documents the investigation of many long-unsolved murders (referred to as "cold cases" in detectives' parlance) through the use of modern forensic science (especially recent advances in DNA techniques), and criminal psychology, in addition to recent breakthroughs in the case(s) involving previously silent witnesses.

On January 19, 2017, Blumhouse Television, AMPLE Entertainment and A&E revived the series for a ten-episode run. The well received reboot features highly cinematic recreations and music. The new episodes first began airing on February 27, 2017. Actor Danny Glover took over for Kurtis as narrator for this new 10-episode series. However, in addition to Danny Glover, Bill Kurtis later returned to reprise his role as host of the series. On August 20, 2021, after a four-year hiatus, the series returned with a new season on A&E, again with Kurtis as the host.

Overview
According to A&E, the show has been widely praised by law enforcement agencies, and its investigative reports are commonly used in the training of detectives.

Cold Case Files first aired as a sub-series of another A&E crime documentary program, Investigative Reports, also hosted by Bill Kurtis, which ran from 1991 to 2011. Reruns of the original 1997 series currently air on broadcast syndication in the United States, usually in lower-profile time slots, and on many RTV stations.

The Blumhouse Television, AMPLE Entertainment reboot has quickly gained popularity on Netflix.

Some episodes of the series have now been adapted into a podcast of the same name, "Cold Case Files," hosted by Brooke Gittings and featuring the voice of the original Cold Case files host, Bill Kurtis. The podcast is part of the PodcastOne podcast network in conjunction with A&E.

Episode list

Season 1 (1999)

Season 2 (2000)

Season 3 (2001)

Season 4 (2002)

Season 5 (2006)

Season 6 (2017)

Season 7 (2021)

Season 8 (2022)

Awards and nominations
Emmy Award:

 Outstanding Nonfiction Series (2005) nomination: Michael Harvey (executive producer), Laura Fleury (executive producer), Tania Lindsay (supervising producer), Michael West (supervising producer), Mary Frances O'Conner (producer), Bill Kurtis (host)
 Outstanding Nonfiction Series (2004) nomination: Laura Fleury (executive producer), Michael Harvey (supervising producer), Mike West (producer), Bill Kurtis (host)

Online Film & Television Association Awards:

 Best Informational Program (2007) - nomination

See also
Solved, USA / ID, 2008 (true cases)
 Cold Justice, USA / TNT, 2013 (true cases)
 To Catch a Killer, CAN / OWN, 2014 (true cases)

References

External links

1999 American television series debuts
1990s American crime television series
2000s American crime television series
2010s American crime television series
2020s American crime television series
1990s American documentary television series
2000s American documentary television series
2010s American documentary television series
2020s American documentary television series
American television series revived after cancellation
A&E (TV network) original programming
English-language television shows